Restore Belize is an organization located in Belize and directed by the government of Belize. It was founded by former Prime Minister Dean Barrow on June 2, 2010. The main purpose of Restore Belize is to make Belize a more peaceful and productive nation by implementing law, order, and community building through active citizenship.

History 
Restore Belize originated from the Prime Minister of Belize, Dean Barrow, to address the elevation of the crime rate in Belize.  The main goals of the program are to achieve human development, economic development and citizen prosperity, and democratic governance and citizen security. The Belizean government, civil society, and private sector come together to formulate public involvement programs to accomplish these goals.

Programs

Conflict Mediation 
The purpose of the conflict mediation program is to provide communities with problem-solving skills, such as conflict reduction, communicating in a respectful manner, and formulating creative problem-solving techniques. Some activities conducted by this program include mediation training workshops and peer-to-peer mediation programs.

I am Belize 
I am Belize is a public education program that seeks to instill social values and positivity. The goal of the program is for Belizeans to adopt exceptional behavior and cultural identity, and transform Belize into a safe, peaceful and productive country. The values that they are seeking to advocate for include national pride, courtesy, fairness, inclusion, integrity, lifelong education, responsible citizenship, and rule of law. These values are achieved by providing youths with scholarships in order to keep them occupied with school. This program also allows youths to engage in activities and programs. Some of these activities include the morning shows Wake up Belize and Peace in the Parks, and motivational missionary tours.

Youth Police Initiative 
The Youth Police initiative focuses on instilling positive changes in the relationships between at-risk youths, the police department and community organizations. The main goals of this initiative are to allow police officers to have a better knowledge of the values, beliefs, and experiences of the younger generation in the community, to make sure a genuine relationship is developed between the younger generation and the police officers and to encourage youths to consider and understand the challenges that police officers face on the job regularly. The activities that take place in this initiative are youths partaking in role-play scenarios with trained personnel, youths giving their reviews during debriefing and youths associating with police officers that are in training to complete course activities and team building exercises. The interaction results in officers learning how to communicate with youths in a more effective manner by constructively engaging with the youths.

Partners 
The three main sectors of the society that Restore Belize collaborates with are the government, civil society, and the private sector. It partners with international development agencies as well. It is a government-directed organization; government ministries, departments, and program units make up a large portion of this organization. The organization is inclusive of six cabinet ministers: the Ministry of National Security , Education, youth, Sports, Health, Human Development, Social Transformation and poverty alleviation, Labour, Local Government, Rural Development, NEMO and Immigration and Nationality; and headed by the Prime Minister.

References 

Organisations based in Belize